Dance of Fire is a 1949 Argentine drama film directed by Daniel Tinayre. It was entered into the 1951 Cannes Film Festival.

Cast
 Amelia Bence
 Francisco de Paula
 Enrique Diosdado
 Alberto Closas
 Floren Delbene
 Otto Sirgo
 Blanca Tapia
 Agustín Barrios
 Norma Key
 Alberto Quiles
 Francisco Audenino
 Percival Murray
 Alberto Barcel

References

External links 

1949 films
1940s Spanish-language films
1949 comedy films
Argentine black-and-white films
Films directed by Daniel Tinayre
Argentine comedy films
1940s Argentine films